Fiction theory is a discipline that applies possible world theory to literature. Fiction theory scholars and critics have articulated various theses rooted in Saul Kripke's application of modal logic to semantics. Drawing on concepts found in possible world theory, theorists of fiction study the relationships between textual worlds and the world outside the text. The overarching idea in fiction theory is that the relationships between the imaginary worlds of fiction and the actual world in which we live are complicated, and that one ought not dismiss fiction as simply stories that are not "true". Theorists of fiction pose challenging questions about, and offer constructive ways of exploring, the often complex relations between the worlds of fiction and the "real" world in which we live.

Fundamentals of fiction theory 
In order to understand fiction theory, one must pose questions about fundamental terms such as text, narrative, literature, fiction, etc. Literature may be understood as a text that is self-consciously artistic, rather than as a text that is used as a medium through which to convey information, for example a newspaper article. Roman Jakobson, a Russian formalist and linguist, was one of the first individuals to discuss art as a way of communication that is intentionally aesthetic, and applied linguistics to analyses of literary texts. In his well-known communication model, Jakobson breaks apart a communicative act between an addressor and addressee into a message, code, context, and contact, with each part having its own function. According to Jakobson's model, art is created when the message itself (which carries the poetic function) is stressed.

The French scholar Roland Barthes designed a system of five major codes that function as tools to analyze narrative texts in ways that move beyond examinations of plot and structure, thereby bringing to the surface the subtle ways a text becomes a literary narrative.

Jakobson's model and Barthes's codes offer critics a way to begin to explore the nature of a literary text through application of semiotics to narrative.

The Actual versus the Fictive 
While Jakobson and Barthes emphasize the intention of the speaker/writer, the philosopher Nelson Goodman examines the broader question of how we create imaginary worlds and categorizes our "Ways of Worldmaking" (the title of his book on this topic) into composition/decomposition, weighting, ordering, deletion/supplementation and reformations. The scholar Marie-Laure Ryan is also concerned less with intention and more with the various ways that fictional worlds are related to the actual world outside the text. Ryan conceptualizes these relations in a framework of accessibility and has developed a typology of accessibility relations that establishes the extent to which fictional worlds are similar to or different from the actual world in which we live. The fictional world that most resembles the actual world is based on the "principle of minimal departure". This idea was first articulated by John Searle and refers to the fundamental property of an imaginary world that is minimally different from the familiar world in which we live. Lubomír Doležel has developed a similar typology based on modal operators that determine the narrative world.

Frank Kermode, in his seminal text The Sense of an Ending: Studies in the Theory of Fiction, argues that ultimate meaning is derived from the end; successive events are predicated on previously established meaning. He articulates a concept of fiction based on this view of humans' constant yearning for an ultimate end that will imbue with meaning everything that preceded it. In this discussion, Kermode distinguishes between fiction and myth. Fiction consists of stories all individuals create about their lives in order to keep on living in a world that makes few guarantees and is full of inexplicable phenomena. Kermode defines myth as a dangerous fiction used for exploitative purposes. The philosopher Hans Vaihinger has articulated similar ideas, putting forward the biological argument that human beings use fictions to help survive in a hostile environment, and that these fictions are so useful that it becomes most difficult, if not impossible, for us to stop ourselves from creating fictions. In Vaihinger's language, fiction is something we treat "as if" it is true even when we know that it is not true, whereas myth is something we treat as true because we do not know it is false.

The literary critic Thomas Pavel argues that the fictional world deserves to be examined on its own terms rather than merely through the lens of mimesis. His thesis serves as a critique of Structuralism by its insistence on the idea that narrativity, as a fundamental aspect of fiction, removes the possibility of pure imitation of the actual world.  Pavel's theory thus departs from the main ideas of other fiction theorists because he separates literature from its referential relationship to the actual world. Following in the footsteps of the Austrian philosopher Alexius Meinong, Pavel asserts that fictional worlds demand tremendous respect for their ability to serve as powerful tools of knowledge rather than for their likeness to the actual world.

References
 Routledge Encyclopedia of Narrative Theory (2005: Routledge)

Further reading 
 Barthes, Roland, S/Z: An Essay (1975: Hill and Wang) 
 Brooks, Peter, Reading for the Plot: Design and Intention in Narrative (1992: Harvard University Press)  
 Culler, Jonathan, Literary Theory: A Very Short Introduction (2000: Oxford University Press) 
 Dolezel, Lubomir, Heterocosmica: Fiction and Possible Worlds (2000: The Johns Hopkins University Press) 
 Goodman, Nelson, Ways of Worldmaking (1978: Hackett Publishing Company) 
 Iser, Wolfgang, The Fictive and the Imaginary: Charting Literary Anthropology (1993: The Johns Hopkins University Press) 
 Jakobson, Roman, “Closing Statement: Linguistics and Poetics,” In Thomas A. Sebeok (ed), Style in Language (1960: MIT Press) 
 Kermode, Frank, The Sense of an Ending: Studies in the Theory of Fiction (2003: Oxford University Press) 
 Pavel, Thomas, Fictional Worlds (1986: Harvard University Press) 
 Ryan, Marie-Laure, Possible Worlds, Artificial Intelligence, and Narrative Theory (1992: Indiana University Press) 
 Vaihinger, Hans, The Philosophy of As If: A System of the Theoretical, Practical, and Religious Fictions of Mankind (1984: Routeledge)

External links 
 Summary of Possible World Theory
 Some of Marie-Laure’s articles on Narrative Theory
 Selections of Roman Jakobson’s Linguistics and Poetics (includes Communication Model)
 On Barthes’s five codes
 A theory on mankind’s entitlement to existence

Modal logic
Communication theory